Cyrille-Edouard Cottin (1870–1942) was a French industrialist and racing driver, co-founder of the Automobiles Cottin et Desgouttes company.

Life 
Cyrille Edouard Cottin was the 4th of the 7 children of Cyrille Cottin who had married Louise Payen in 1863, hailing from a large family of the Lyon bourgeoisie, the descendants of which have had numerous alliances with French nobility. His father held his fortune from the family silk business created in 1830 and of which he was an associate: "Les petits fils de Claude-Joseph Bonnet".

Due to the large number of descendants of the latter, the custom was that only the elder sons of each branch could enter the business. Thus, Cottin, who could not enter, created his own business and teamed with Pierre Desgoutte in 1906, when he was 36 years old.

He invested his fortune, helped by his wife's dowry (born Adda Bourras), and the trust which he got from his friends, relationships and family in the Lyons middle-class.

He was a man full of character, dynamic and daring, with a definite charisma. All of this together with the high technical competence of Pierre Desgoutte, allowed the new company Cottin & Desgoutte to develop rapidly.

Cottin was also first-class racing driver, racing both in France and abroad in North Africa, Zurich and Australia where he won the 400-mile Race. After World War I, he returned to competition, winning regularly on his famous M Type.

When the company encountered its first difficulties in 1929, André Citroën, who was already mass-producing automobiles, proposed to acquire the company. Through pride, Cottin refused and eventually lost most of his fortune.

References

External links 
 

1870 births
Emlyon Business School alumni
French racing drivers
French founders of automobile manufacturers
1942 deaths